Pionerskaya is a Moscow Metro station in the Fili-Davydkovo District, Western Administrative Okrug, Moscow. It was built in 1961, and was the terminus of the line until 1965.

Building
The station sits in a shallow cut, with the platform on the lower level and the street-level vestibule above. A road overpass (providing access to the vestibule) covers part of the platform; the rest is protected only by a narrow canopy. The single row of pillars is faced with white marble and the platform is a plain concrete slab. The architect was Rober Pogrebnoi.

External links

metro.ru
mymetro.ru
KartaMetro.info — Station location and exits on Moscow map (English/Russian)

Moscow Metro stations
Railway stations in Russia opened in 1961
Filyovskaya Line